Kentucky Route 980 (KY 980) is a  long state highway located entirely in Allen County in south-central Kentucky. It originates at the junction with U.S. Route 231 and U.S. Route 31E on the west side of Scottsville, and ends in downtown Scottsville at a junction with Kentucky Route 100.

History 
 
KY 980 was originally part of U.S. 231 going into Scottsville. US 231 was rerouted onto the US 31E alignment west of town during the 1970s.

Major intersections

References

External links
Kentucky Transportation Cabinet

U.S. Route 231
0980
0980